"Cowgirl" is a song recorded by Underworld, originally released as a single in 1994. The track is from the band's 1994 album Dubnobasswithmyheadman.

In Underworld's live performances, "Cowgirl" is often played with "Rez", as they share key elements and samples. The typical arrangement is to open with "Rez" and mix into "Cowgirl", with the "Rez" melody usually brought back at the climax.  The track is usually labelled "Rez / Cowgirl" in fan-distributed bootlegs. This combination also appears on the live album Everything, Everything. Slant Magazine ranked the song number 30 in its 100 Greatest Dance Songs list, adding: "The jewel in the Orwellian dubnobasswithmyheadman’s crown was "Cowgirl"—everything, everything Underworld's thundering electronica has come to represent as a musical and political force."

A key lyrical element in the song is Karl Hyde's repeated chant "Everything, everything," which inspired the title of the live album of the same name. While the version of "Cowgirl" listed on the single is the "album version", the version found on the album Dubnobasswithmyheadman is lightly edited, with a running time of 8:31; the full length version would later appear on the soundtrack to Hackers.

Track listing

CD: Intercord / INT 825.421 (Germany)
 "Cowgirl" (album version) – 8:55
 "Cowgirl" (Irish Pub in Kyoto Mix) – 11:45
 "Cowgirl" (Winjer Mix) – 6:25
 "Rez" – 9:55

12": Intercord / INT 193.016 (Germany)
 "Cowgirl" (album version)
 "Cowgirl" (Irish Pub in Kyoto Mix)

12": Junior Boy's Own / JBO 1001 (UK) 
Titled Cowgirl / Rez
 "Rez"
 "Cowgirl"

12": WaxTrax! TVT / TVT 8724-0 (USA)
 "Cowgirl" (Irish Pub in Kyoto Mix) – 11:45
 "Cowgirl" (Album Version) – 8:55
 "Cowgirl" (Winjer Mix) – 6:25

Cowgirl (Live)

"Cowgirl" (live) was a live recording of "Cowgirl" released by Underworld in 2000, taken from their live album Everything, Everything. It contains newly commissioned remixes of the original song as well as the live recording of "Rez"/"Cowgirl", as featured on the album and video release.  The single peaked on the UK Singles Chart at number 24.

Track listing

CD: Junior Boy's Own, JBO5012513 (UK) Part 1/2
 "Cowgirl" (edit) (live) – 3:40
 "Cowgirl" (Bedrock Mix) – 11:50
 "Cowgirl" (edit) (enhanced live video)

CD: Junior Boy's Own, JBO5012618 (UK) Part 2/2
 "Cowgirl" (Futureshock Mix) – 8:26
 "Rez/Cowgirl" (live) – 11:32
 "Rez/Cowgirl" (Enhanced live video)

CD: Junior Boy's Own, JBO5014828 (SE)
 "Cowgirl" (edit) (live) – 3:40
 "Cowgirl" (Bedrock Mix) – 11:50

CD: Junior Boy's Own, JBO5014823 (EU/AU); V2, V2CI 79 (JP)
 "Cowgirl" (edit) (live) – 3:40
 "Cowgirl" (Bedrock Mix) – 11:50
 "Cowgirl" (Futureshock Mix) – 9:30
 "Rez/Cowgirl" (live) – 11:32
 "Cowgirl" (edit) (enhanced live video)

CD: Junior Boy's Own, JBO5012533P (UK) promo
 "Cowgirl" (edit) (live) – 3:40
 "Cowgirl" (Bedrock Mix) – 11:50
 "Cowgirl" (Futureshock Mix)" – 8:26

12": Junior Boy's Own, JBO5012516 (UK)
 "Cowgirl" (Bedrock Mix) – 11:50
 "Cowgirl" (Futureshock Mix) – 9:30

Charts
"Cowgirl (Live)"

References

External links
Underworldlive.com
Single information from the unofficial Underworld discography web site - BigScreenSatellite

Underworld (band) songs
1994 singles
2000 singles
1994 songs
Songs written by Darren Emerson
Songs written by Rick Smith (musician)
Songs written by Karl Hyde